"Hiromi" is Jun Shibata's 14th single and first to break into the Top 5. It was released on January 11, 2007, and peaked at #5. A short film starring Shibata herself was also based on this song.

Track listing
Hiromi 1 2
Ato sukoshi dake... (あと少しだけ・・・; Just a Little More...)

1 Hiromi is a Japanese unisex name.
2 Hiromi is the only Jun Shibata song to have a title in Latin characters.

Charts

References

External links
https://web.archive.org/web/20161030094458/http://www.shibatajun.com/— Shibata Jun Official Website

2007 singles
Jun Shibata songs
2007 songs
Victor Entertainment singles